Haldur Lasthein (1 June 1905 – 24 April 1986) was a Danish footballer. He played in four matches for the Denmark national football team from 1925 to 1931.

References

External links
 

1905 births
1986 deaths
Danish men's footballers
Denmark international footballers
Place of birth missing
Association footballers not categorized by position